Mayer Palace may refer to:

 Central Pharmacy, Ljubljana, Prešeren Square 5
 Mayer department store, Wolf Street 1, Ljubljana